The 2019 Sahlen's Six Hours of the Glen was an endurance race sanctioned by the International Motor Sports Association (IMSA). The race was held at Watkins Glen International in Watkins Glen, New York on the June 30th, 2019. This race was the sixth round of the 2019 WeatherTech SportsCar Championship, as well as the third round of the 2019 Michelin Endurance Cup.

Background
IMSA released two separate technical bulletins regarding the Balance of Performance for the six-hour race. The first one was released on May 23rd, 2019, for the GT Le Mans (GTLM) class. This was done to allow IMSA teams who were preparing for the 24 Hours of Le Mans in three weeks time, notably Corvette Racing and Chip Ganassi Racing, to have the beforehand knowledge of the Balance of Performance for the race so they could prepare better. In this bulletin, the BMW M8 GTE received a 12 horsepower increase, as well as a six liter increase in fuel capacity and turbo boost increase. The second technical bulletin was released on June 19th, 2019, which regarded the Balance of Performance for the Daytona Prototype International (DPi) and GT Daytona (GTD) classes. In DPi, after winning the previous two events, Team Penske's Acura ARX-05 was given a 15 kilogram weight increase, giving it the same weight as the Nissan DPi. The Cadillac DPi-V.R was given a 1 liter reduction in fuel capacity. In GT Daytona, despite no McLarens participating in the 6 Hour event, the McLaren 720S was given a power increase of 15 horsepower and made 25 kilograms lighter, in addition to a 12-liter fuel capacity increase. These adjustments made the McLaren 720S the lightest car in the class, as well as having the largest fuel capacity.

Entries

On June 19th, 2019, the entry list for the 6-hour-event was released, featuring 37 cars. There were 11 entries in Daytona Prototype international, eight cars in GT Le Mans, 16 in GT Daytona, and just two entrants in the Le Mans Prototype (LMP2) class. In GT Daytona, Sprint-race-only entrants Compass Racing and Lone Star Racing would not be taking part, while endurance-event-only entrants such as Land-Motorsport made their return. Black Swan Racing also returned to the grid after missing the 12 Hours of Sebring due to their team owner Tim Pappas sustaining an injury. As he was still recovering, Marc Miller took his place for The Glen. Joey Hand made a full recovery from suffering symptoms of the flu, and returned to the Chip Ganassi Racing team after being replaced by Sebastien Bourdais for the previous two rounds.

Practice and qualifying

Qualifying Results 

Results

Notes

References

External links

6 Hours of Watkins Glen
6 Hours of Watkins Glen
6 Hours of Watkins Glen